Voices Of Our Future is a New Zealand reality television show that airs on Māori Television. It premiered on 19 July 2017. The show documents the lives of 12 talented singers who made a hit song for Maori language week in 2016.

Production
The show was announced in July 2017.

The show premiered on 19 July 2017.

References

New Zealand reality television series
2017 New Zealand television series debuts